Sneha is a 1999 Indian Kannada language romantic drama film directed by V. S. Reddy and produced by Mohan Natarajan. The film stars  V. Ravichandran, Ramya Krishna, Raasi and Karan in the leading roles. The film was a remake of Telugu film Snehithulu (1998) directed by Muthyala Subbaiah and written by Posani Krishna Murali. The film was also remade in Tamil as Aasaiyil Oru Kaditham (1999). The music was composed by Ravichandran to the lyrics of K. Kalyan. The film spoke about the friendship between a man and woman and their troubled marital relationships.

Cast 
 V. Ravichandran as Murali
 Ramya Krishna as Kavya
 Raasi as Mahalakshmi
 Karan as Vijay
 Srinivasa Murthy as Vijay's father
 Doddanna as Mahalakshmi's father
 Kashi as Murali's friend
 Chitra Shenoy as Vijay's mother
 Mandya Ramesh as Jagadish
 Thalapathi Dinesh

Soundtrack 
The music was composed by V. Ravichandran and lyrics were written by K. Kalyan. A total of 6 tracks have been composed for the film and the audio rights brought by Lahari Music.

References

External links 

 Sneha at Nthwall

1999 films
1990s Kannada-language films
Indian romantic drama films
Kannada remakes of Telugu films
Indian buddy films
1990s buddy films
1999 romantic drama films
Films scored by V. Ravichandran